Jim Hawthorne may refer to:

 Jim Hawthorne (DJ) (1918–2007), American radio personality and disc jockey
 Jim Hawthorne (sportscaster), American radio sportscaster for the LSU Tigers

See also
 James Hawthorne (fl. 1951–2006), BBC Controller in Northern Ireland
 James C. Hawthorne (1819–1881), American physician and politician